John of Montfort (died 27 November 1283) was lord of Toron from 1257 to 1266 and Lord of Tyre from 1270 to 1283. He was the son of Philip of Montfort (lord of La Ferté-Alais, of Bréthencourt, of Castres, of Toron and of Tyre), and his second wife Maria of Antioch-Armenia (the elder daughter of Raymond-Roupen of Antioch and hence Lady of Toron and pretender of Armenia).

When he came of age, he received the lordship of Toron from his father, but the Mamluks conquered it in 1266. On 22 September 1268 he married Margaret, daughter of Henry of Antioch and of Isabella of Cyprus. Margaret was the sister of king Hugh III of Cyprus, who later became king of Jerusalem and negotiated a certain number of alliances with the nobility of the kingdom in order to shore up his pretence against Charles I of Sicily.  On the occasion of this marriage, Hugh III confirmed Montfort's possession of Tyre but reserved the throne's right to retake the fiefdom if John and Margaret died without issue.

In 1270 his father was killed by the Assassins, and John succeeded to the lordship and governed Tyre until his death in 1283.  He had no children, so Hugh III allowed  Humphrey of Montfort to succeed his brother.

Sources

1283 deaths
Christians of Lord Edward's crusade
John
John
Year of birth unknown